John Gudenus or John, Graf von Gudenus (23 November 1940 – 15 September 2016) was an Austrian member of the Federal Council of Austria on a free mandate (formerly as a member of the Freedom Party of Austria), and colonel of the Austrian Bundesheer.

Early life 
Born into the noble Gudenus family, he was born as the eldest child of Johann Baptist Theodor Franz de Paula Philipp Maria, Graf von Gudenus (1908-1968) and his wife, Karin Giaver (1905-1980).

Biography 
In 2006, Gudenus received a one-year suspended sentence for breaking the Verbotsgesetz, Austria's laws against denying or diminishing the Holocaust. Gudenus had suggested that it was necessary to verify the existence of gas chambers in Nazi Germany and later remarked that there had been gas chambers in Poland but not in Germany.

Austria's Der Standard newspaper argued that these two remarks were "cynical and humiliating", and show contempt for the Verbotsgesetz.

Personal life 
On 12 August 1970 in Els, John Gudenus married Marie Louise Biloghan (b. 1951). They have four sons:
 Markus John Gudenus (b. 1974)
 Johann Baptist Björn Gudenus (b. 1976), FPÖ politician 
 Jens Severin Gudenus (1983)
 Clemens Magnus Gudenus (1990)

References

Bibliography

External links

1940 births
2016 deaths
Members of the National Council (Austria)
Austrian untitled nobility
Austrian Holocaust deniers
People convicted of Holocaust denial